Hungarian science fiction comprises books and films in the fiction genre produced all across Hungary.

Péter Zsoldos was a science fiction author who largely wrote about themes common in US/UK science fiction like space travel and robots. His best known work is probably Ellenpont, which translates as Counterpoint. The book explores the attempts of artificial intelligences abandoned by Man to uncover their origins and, ultimately, to rediscover mankind.

Authors
Mihály Babits
Júlia Goldman
Ilona Hegedűs
Péter Hédervári
Frigyes Karinthy
Péter Kuczka
György Kulin
László L. Lőrincz
István Nemere
Jenő Rejtő
Sándor Szathmári
Dezső Kemény
Péter Lengyel
Hernády Gyula
Mesterházi Lajos  
Darázs Endre 
Balázs Arpád
Bogati Péter
Bárány Tamás 
Örkény István  
Cserna József
Moldova György  
Péter Zsoldos

Films
 Alraune (1918 film)
 The Adventures of Pirx (1973)
 A feladat (1975)
 A halhatatlanság halála directed by András Rajnai in 1976 based on The End of Eternity by Isaac Asimov
 The Fortress (1979 film)
 6:3 Play It Again Tutti (1999)
 1 (2009 film)
 Thelomeris (2011)

Animation
 Les Maîtres du temps (lit. The Masters of Time, a.k.a. Time Masters, Az idő urai in Hungarian) is a 1982 Franco-Hungarian animated science fiction feature film directed by René Laloux and designed by Mœbius. It is based on the 1958 science fiction novel L'Orphelin de Perdide (The Orphan of Perdide) by Stefan Wul.
 The Tragedy of Man (2011 film)

Magazines 
 Galaktika (1972-1995)

Galaktika was a science fiction magazine of Hungary, published between 1972  and 1995. The peak of 94,000 copies was very high (compared to the population of Hungary [pop. 10 million] while Analog magazine was printed in 120,000 copies in the United States [pop. well over 200 million]), when reached its peak period, it was one of the largest science-fiction magazines of the world, and the quality of individual volumes was high.

A newer publication with the same name has been published since 2004 that is known for its practice of translating and publishing works without obtaining the permission of the authors and without paying them.

Video games
 Crysis Warhead (2008)

Notes

External links
 A short history of Hungarian science fiction from the beginning to the 1980s, sfmag.hu
 Rinyu Zsolt - A tudományos-fantasztikus irodalom helyzete Magyarországon (The situation of science-fiction literature in Hungary), epa.oszk.hu